Cameroon is home to at least 250 languages. However, some accounts report around 600 languages. These include 55 Afro-Asiatic languages, two Nilo-Saharan languages, four Ubangian languages, and 169 Niger–Congo languages. This latter group comprises one Senegambian language (Fulfulde), 28 Adamawa languages, and 142 Benue–Congo languages (130 of which are Bantu languages).
French and English are official languages, a heritage of Cameroon's colonial past as a colony of both France and the United Kingdom from 1916 to 1961. Eight out of the ten regions of Cameroon are primarily francophone, representing 83% of the country's population, and two are anglophone, representing 17%. The anglophone proportion of the country is in constant regression, having decreased from 21% in 1976 to 20% in 1987 and to 17% in 2005, and is estimated at 16% in 2015 (whose fourth census should take place in 2015).

The nation strives toward bilingualism, but in reality very few (11.6%) Cameroonians are literate in both French and English, and 28.8% are literate in neither. The government has established several bilingual schools in an effort to teach both languages more evenly; however, in reality most of these schools separate the anglophone and francophone sections and therefore do not provide a true bilingual experience. Cameroon is a member of both the Commonwealth of Nations and La Francophonie. German, the country's official language during the German colonial period until World War I, has nowadays almost entirely yielded to its two successors. However, as a foreign language subject German still enjoys huge popularity among pupils and students, with 300,000 people learning or speaking German in Cameroon in 2010. Today, Cameroon is one of the African countries with the highest number of people with knowledge of German.

Most people in the English-speaking Northwest and Southwest provinces speak Cameroonian Pidgin English, also called Kamtok, as a lingua franca. Fulfulde serves the same function in the north, and Ewondo in much of the Center, South, and East provinces.
Camfranglais (or Frananglais) is a relatively new pidgin communication form emerging in urban areas and other locations where Anglophone and Francophone Cameroonians meet and interact. Popular singers have used the hybrid language and added to its popularity.

Education for the deaf in Cameroon uses American Sign Language, introduced by the deaf American missionary Andrew Foster.

There is little literature, radio, or television programming in native Cameroonian languages. Nevertheless, many Cameroonian languages have alphabets or other writing systems, many developed by the Christian missionary group SIL International, who have translated the Bible, Christian hymns, and other materials. The General Alphabet of Cameroon Languages was developed in the late 1970s as an orthographic system for all Cameroonian languages.

In the late 19th century, the Bamum script was developed by Sultan Ibrahim Njoya to write the Bamum (Shüpamom) language.

Official languages 

Literacy in French for individuals of age 12 and above rose from 41.3% to 57.6% between 1987 and 2005 while that of English rose from 13.4% to 25.3%. The global proportion of individuals literate in official languages has thus markedly increased between 1987 and 2005, rising from 53.3% to 71.2%.

In 2005, the probability to be literate in French while being anglophone was 0.46 while that of being literate in English while being francophone was 0.20, resulting from the predominant status of the French language in Cameroon as a whole.

Indigenous languages
Most of the 260 languages spoken in Cameroon are indigenous languages. With a population estimated in 25 million people, UNESCO classified the country as a distinctive cultural density. The National Institute of Statistics of Cameroon reported that four percent of the indigenous languages have disappeared since 1950. Currently, ten percent of them are neglected, and seven percent of them are considered as threatened.

Ethnologue
The following list of languages in Cameroon is mostly based from Ethnologue.

ALCAM (2012)
The Atlas linguistique du Cameroun (ALCAM, or "Linguistic Atlas of Cameroon") lists about 250 languages in Cameroon. The list is provided below.

Classification
The 2012 edition of the Atlas linguistique du Cameroun (ALCAM) provides the following classification of the Niger–Congo languages of Cameroon.

Adamawa
Samba
Daka
Kobo-Dii (Vere-Duru)
North: Doyayo, Longto
South: Peere
Mumuye
Mbum
North: Tupuri, Mundang, Mambay
South: Mbum, Pana, Kali-Dek, Kuo, Gbete, Pam, Ndai
Fali: North, South
Nimbari

Ubangian
Gbaya; Bangando
Baka

Benue-Congo
Jukunoid: Mbembe, Njukun, Kutep, Uuhum-Gigi, Busua, Bishuo, Bikya, Kum, Beezen Nsaa
Cross River: Korop; Efik
Bendi: Boki
Bantoid (see below)

Bantoid
Mambiloid: Njoyame, Nizaa, Mambila, Kwanja, Bung, Kamkam, Vute
Tivoid: Njwande, Tiv, Iyive, Iceve, Evand, Ugare, Esimbi, Batomo, Assumbo, Eman, Caka, Ihatum, Amasi
Ekoid: Ejagham
Nyang: Denya, Kendem, Kenyang
Beboid
Western: Naki, Bu, Misong, Koshin, Muŋgɔŋ, Cuŋ
Eastern: Bebe, Kemezuŋ, Ncane, Nsari, Noone, Busuu, Bishuo, Bikya
Grassfield (see below)
Bantu (see below)

Grassfield
Western
Momo
Ngwɔ, Widikum
Menchum
Modele, Befang
Ring
West: Aghem
Central: Mmen
East: Lamnso'
South: Kənswei Nsei, Niemeng, Vəŋo, Wushi
Eastern
Ngemba: Bafut, Mundum, Mankon, Bambili, Nkwen, Pinyin
Bamileke-Central: Ngomable, New; Kwa', Ghomala', Fe'fe', Nda'nda'
Noun: Mamenyan, Shüpamem, Bangolan, Cirambo, Bamali, Bafanji, Mungaka, Medumba
Northern: Limbum, Dzodinka, Yamba, Mbe', Central Mfumte, Southern Mfumte

Bantu
Jarawan: Ngoŋ-Nagumi, Mboŋa
Mbam (see below)
Equatorial: A, B, C, D (partial) (see below)
Zambeze: D (partial), E, F, G, H ,I, J, K, L, M, N, P, R, S

Mbam
ex-A40b
Ndemli, Tikari
Ninyoo, Tunan, Nomande, Atomp
Nigi
Bati
ex-A60
Yambasa: Nugunu, Nuasua, Nubaca, Dumbula
Sanaga: Tuki

Equatorial Bantu
North
A
Bafia (A50): Təbɛya, Lefa', Dimboŋ, Ripɛy, Rikpa
B
Coastal
A10: Oroko (West, East dialects), Lifɔ'-Balɔŋ, Nsose, Akoose
A20: Bakɔlɛ, Wumbuko, Mokpwe, Isu, Bubia; Duala
A30: Yasa, Batanga
Basaa-Beti (A40, A70): Bankon, Basaa, Bakoko; Bəti-Faŋ, Bəmbələ, Bəbil
Meka (A80): Məkaa, Sɔ, Bikele, Kwasio, Bagyɛli, Kɔɔzime, Mpo
Kakɔ (A90): Polri, Kwakum, Kakɔ
South: B, C, D (partial)

See also

Demographics of Cameroon
General Alphabet of Cameroon Languages
Francophone Africa
Cameroonian Pidgin English

References

Sources
 DeLancey, Mark W., and DeLancey, Mark Dike (2000): Historical Dictionary of the Republic of Cameroon (3rd ed.). Lanham, Maryland: The Scarecrow Press.
 Neba, Aaron, Ph.D. (1999). Modern Geography of the Republic of Cameroon, 3rd ed. Bamenda: Neba Publishers.

External links
 Ethnologue page on Languages of Cameroon
 PanAfriL10n page on Cameroon
 Aménagement linguistique dans le monde - Cameroun
 Leinyui, Usmang Salle. n.d. "Bilingualism." TranslationDirectory.com (article focuses on Cameroon)
 Rosendal, Tove. 2008. "Multilingual Cameroon: Policy, Practice, Problems and Solutions." University of Gothenburg, Africana Informal Series, No. 7